Decision is an NBC anthology TV series produced by Screen Gems that aired as a summer replacement for The Loretta Young Show from July 6, 1958 to September 28, 1958. Half of the episodes were repeats from other anthology programs. The other episodes consisted of repurposed failed pilots, including a TV adaptation of the Owen Wister novel The Virginian, starring James Drury. He would later star in a TV adaptation of the same novel.

The program was broadcast from 10 to 10:30 p.m. Eastern Time on Sundays. Directors included Lamont Johnson, Lewis Allen (director), David Lowell Rich and Fred Zinneman.

References

External links
Decision at CVTA

1950s American anthology television series
1958 American television series debuts
1958 American television series endings
Black-and-white American television shows
NBC original programming